Aleksandr Alekseyevich Kuznetsov (born 21 March 1997) is a Russian football player.

Club career
He made his professional debut in the Russian Professional Football League for FC Rubin-2 Kazan on 18 July 2014 in a game against FC Syzran-2003.

He played his first game for the main squad of FC Rubin Kazan on 24 September 2015 in a Russian Cup game against FC SKA-Energiya Khabarovsk which his team lost 0-2.

References

1997 births
Association football defenders
Living people
Russian footballers
Place of birth missing (living people)
FC Rubin Kazan players
FC Neftekhimik Nizhnekamsk players